Spencer Stuart is an American global executive search and leadership consulting firm based in Chicago, Illinois. It was founded in 1956, operates 57 offices in 30 countries and is privately owned. In 2009, the Wall Street Journal described the firm as the U.S. government's main resource for finding replacement executives for companies bailed out during the Great Recession.

The Yahoo! board of directors retained the firm in June 2012 to conduct a search to replace former CEO Scott Thompson. The Twitter board of directors retained  the firm in June 2015 to conduct a search to replace former CEO Dick Costolo.

During the 2009 government bailouts of struggling U.S. companies, the firm worked with the majority of the companies to replace company leadership and board members.   Some competitors expressed frustration with Spencer Stuart's dominance in federally funded recruitment.

References

External links
 
POV 2015 online (corporate magazine)

Companies based in Chicago
Business services companies established in 1956
Executive search firms
1956 establishments in Illinois